Elections to the Wigan council were held on Thursday, 5 May 1988, with one third of the seats up for election as well as an extra vacancy in Beech Hill. Following the previous election, two by-elections had taken place, with the Labour Party successfully defending their seats in Ince and Newtown. This year's election seen an improvement in participation, with all wards fought and five parties contesting in some form, by way of the Greens fielding their first ever slate of four candidates and the return of long-time Communist contender H. Kedward in Leigh Central. Despite this, the number of candidates contesting actually fell by five from the previous year's 64, as the turbulent new merger of the old SDP-Liberal Alliance, Social and Liberal Democrats, fielded just half the number of candidates they'd managed in 1987 and, at 11, the lowest since 1980.

This was reflected by the results on the night as the SLD suffered a large drop in their vote, returning them to third place behind the Conservatives and reducing their vote total to four figure for the first time since the aforementioned 1980 election. The overwhelming beneficiary of SLD losses were the Labour, helping their vote share hit a record high of 68.6% and the highest vote figure gained - beyond the anomaly of 1979 - since the council's creation. Seat wise, Labour made two gains of the night, one in the SLD-Labour marginal of Aspull-Standish and the other in the more significant SLD bastion of Langtree, which until this point had only elected SLD candidates, where Labour managed to equal SLD votes and draw the larger straw. Labour achieved a record capture of seats, with opposition wins curtailed to an exceptional SLD performance - and gain - of one of the seats fought in Beech Hill and a Conservative hold in their bastion of Swinley. Overall turnout fell from 37.1% to 32.4%.

Election result

This result had the following consequences for the total number of seats on the Council after the elections:

Ward results

References

1988 English local elections
1988
1980s in Greater Manchester